Skorpo may refer to the following locations:
Skorpo, Askøy, an island west of Hetlevik in Askøy municipality, Vestland county, Norway
Skorpo, Bjørnafjorden, an island west of Nordstrøno in Bjørnafjorden municipality, Vestland county, Norway
Skorpo, Kvinnherad, an island west of Uskedalen in Kvinnherad municipality, Vestland county, Norway
Skorpo, Sveio, an island in Vigdarvatnet in Sveio municipality, Vestland county, Norway
Skorpo, Tysnes, an island south of Onarheim in Tysnes municipality, Vestland county, Norway